Total body disruption is the immediate and nonsurvivable destruction of the body.

Commonly referred to as being "blown up", "blown apart", turned into "a (pink or red) mist" in modern culture, or "dashed to pieces" in older literature, total body disruption may be caused by being within or in close proximity to a powerful explosion. Total body disruption is the most severe type of blast injury. Total body disruption may also be caused by a fall from terminal velocity, or from being within a high-speed crashing object. 

Total body disruption is invariably fatal to humans and animals, since the brain (if not outright destroyed) is deprived of oxygenated blood, while other organs (if not outright destroyed) are deprived of the involuntary functions that are needed for the body to function.

Incomplete, initially unidentifiable human remains caused by total body disruption may be referred to as "disassociated portions".

See also 
 Decapitation
 Dismemberment
 Hemicorporectomy

Causes of death

References